Foran is a surname of Irish origin. Notable people with the surname include:

Charles Foran, (born 1960) Canadian novelist
Dick Foran, (1910–1979), American actor
Jim Foran, (1848–1928) American baseball player
John Winston Foran, (born 1952) Canadian politician 
Kieran Foran, (born 1980), New Zealand rugby league player
Liam Foran, (born 1988), New Zealand rugby league player
Mark Foran, (born 1973), English footballer